QNN may refer to:

 Quantum neural network, computational neural network models which are based on the principles of quantum mechanics
 Quds News Network, the leading news agency in the state of Palestine